The white-footed frog (Neobatrachus albipes), or white-footed trilling frog, is a species of frog in the family Limnodynastidae.
It is endemic to the Esperance mallee ecoregion of Australia. (C.Michael Hogan. 2012)
Its natural habitats are temperate shrubland, Mediterranean-type shrubby vegetation, intermittent freshwater marshes, and seasonally flooded agricultural land.

References

 C.Michael Hogan. 2012. Esperance mallee. ed. Peter Saundry. Encyclopedia of Earth. National Council for Science and the Environment. Washington DC

Neobatrachus
Amphibians of Western Australia
Taxonomy articles created by Polbot
Amphibians described in 1991
Frogs of Australia